Fernando Márquez Joya (17th century) was a Spanish late-Baroque painter. His dates of birth and death are not known.

Not much is known of his life. He is known to have studied under Pedro Nuñez de Villavicencio. He primarily painted religious-themed works for regional churches on commission. His style reflected an influence of Bartolomé Esteban Murillo.

External links and references

Year of birth unknown
Year of death unknown
17th-century Spanish painters
Spanish male painters
Spanish Baroque painters